NEXTV is a Canada-based Over the Top provider that delivers digital television services via Internet.  It launched in 2007 and is owned by Ethnic Channels Group, a Canadian ethnic broadcaster.  NEXTV offers an array of multicultural channels to subscribers, via a set-top box and high speed Internet connection. In 2012, Ethnic Channels Group acquired a BDU license for the Greater Toronto Area.

NOTE: Service ended December 31, 2021 according to their website.

Requirements
NEXTV delivers video and audio to the subscriber's home using their existing high speed internet connection. In order to receive the services offered by NEXTV, consumers require a high-speed Internet connection with a speed of at least 5.0Mbit/s and a set-top box which can be purchased in local stores.

Resources
 The face of ethnic media (Interview with Slava Levin -ECG & NEXTV)
 OTT A Major Challenge to Satellite, Ethnic Channels Group Says (Interview with Slava Levin - Co-founder and CEO of Ethnic Channels Group)
 New Sports Channel Wants to Play in Canada

See also
 IPTV
 Ethnic Channels Group

Broadband
Streaming television in Canada
Mass media companies of Canada
2007 establishments in Ontario
Companies based in Markham, Ontario